Poker is a 1951 Swedish drama film directed by Gösta Bernhard and starring Stig Järrel, Kenne Fant and Ingrid Backlin.

Partial cast
 Stig Järrel as Mr. Alkeryd aka Spindeln 
 Kenne Fant as Sven Bergström 
 Ingrid Backlin as Mrs. Elsa Bergström 
 Arne Källerud as 'Rövarn' 
 Lars Ekborg as Pelle Axelsson 
 Margaretha Löwler as Ingalill 
 Björn Berglund as Wilkers

References

Bibliography 
 Alfred Krautz. International directory of cinematographers, set- and costume designers in film, Volume 5. Saur, 1986.

External links 
 

1951 films
1951 drama films
Swedish drama films
1950s Swedish-language films
Films directed by Gösta Bernhard
Swedish black-and-white films
1950s Swedish films